St. Paul's Protestant Episcopal Church may refer to:

in the United States
(by state)
St. Paul's Episcopal Church (Georgetown, Delaware), listed on the NRHP in Delaware
St. Paul's Protestant Episcopal Church (Baltimore, Maryland), listed on the NRHP in Maryland
St. Paul's by-the-sea Protestant Episcopal Church, Ocean City, Worcester County, Maryland, listed on the NRHP in Maryland
St. Paul's Protestant Episcopal Church (Tulls Corner, Maryland), listed on the NRHP in Maryland
St. Paul's Church (Carroll Gardens, Brooklyn), New York, listed on the NRHP in New York

See also
 St. Paul's Church (disambiguation)
 St. Paul's Episcopal Church (disambiguation)